The 2010 Brno Formula Two round was the seventh round of the 2010 FIA Formula Two Championship and was held on July 31 and August 1, 2010 at the Masaryk Circuit, Brno, Czech Republic. Nicola de Marco won the first 20-lap race from second position, earning his first series victory. Dean Stoneman, the pole position starter of the round, finished in second position and Sergey Afanasyev was third. Jolyon Palmer took the win in the second 19-lap race from a second position start. Stoneman took second place and Kazim Vasiliauskas finished third.

Classification

Qualifying 1

Qualifying 2

Race 1

Race 2

References

FIA Formula Two Championship